Clifty is an unincorporated community in Fayette County, in the U.S. state of West Virginia.

The community was named for cliffs near the original town site.

References

Unincorporated communities in Fayette County, West Virginia
Unincorporated communities in West Virginia